Mic Graves is a British animation director, writer, producer, and voice actor known for his work on Cartoon Network's The Amazing World of Gumball and Elliott from Earth.

Animation career
Graves first worked at Studio AKA where he worked on commercials, title sequences, and idents from 1994 to 2009; the most famous of these is The Canterbury Tales: Knight's Tale. While working at Studio AKA, he was hired to be an assistant art director on The Big Knights from 1999 to 2000. He was then hired by The Amazing World of Gumball creator Ben Bocquelet to be the series director and a writer, executive producer, and voice actor from 2011 to 2019. After the show ended in 2019, he served as a supervising director, writer, and executive producer on Elliott from Earth.

Filmography

Short films

Television

References

External links

Animation directors
Year of birth missing (living people)
Cartoon Network Studios people
Living people